River Rouge School District is a public school district  in Wayne County in the U.S. state of Michigan.  The district serves the entire city of River Rouge just south of the city of the Detroit.  The district encompasses  of the city of River Rouge and also includes a very small portion of the northern city limits of Ecorse to the south.  The district had an enrollment of 2,279 for the 2019–20 school year across four schools, including an online virtual school.

Schools

Images

References

External links
 River Rouge School District

Education in Wayne County, Michigan
School districts in Michigan